Rhein-Lahn-Kreis is a district (Kreis) in the east of Rhineland-Palatinate, Germany. Neighboring districts are (from north clockwise) Westerwaldkreis, Limburg-Weilburg, Rheingau-Taunus, Mainz-Bingen, Rhein-Hunsrück, Mayen-Koblenz, and the district-free city Koblenz.

History
With the Congress of Vienna the area was added to the duchy of Nassau. When Nassau lost independence in 1866 it was added to Prussia, who then in 1867 created the Regierungsbezirk Wiesbaden, and as parts of it the two districts Rheingaukreis and Unterlahnkreis. The Rheingaukreis became the district St. Goarshausen in 1885. In 1969 the two districts were merged into the new Rhein-Lahn district.

Geography
The name of the district already mentions the two biggest rivers of the district. The Rhine forms the boundary to the west, its narrow valley is used for wine cultivation. The Lahn flows through the northern part of the district until it joins the Rhine near Lahnstein. In the southern part of the district are the hills of the Taunus.

Coat of arms
The coat of arms most prominently shows a lion, as most of the historic rulers of the area had a lion in their coat of arms. These include the Counts of Diez, the Counts and later Princes of Nassau, the Counts of Katzenelnbogen and the Princes of the Electorate of the Palatinate. The two colors red and blue represent the two districts which were merged to form the Rhein-Lahn district - the blue derives from Nassau, the red from the clerical states of Trier and Mainz.

Towns and municipalities

References

External links

 Official website (German)

 
Districts of Rhineland-Palatinate